The 2008 Asian Weightlifting Championships were held at Ishikawa Sports Center in Kanazawa City, Ishikawa Prefecture Japan between April 26 and May 5 2008. It was the 39th men's and 20th women's championship. Much of the responsibility for the event lay with the Japan Weightlifting Association overlooked by the Asian Weightlifting Federation. The event had major significance for Asian weightlifters as the championships were the official qualifications for Weightlifting at the 2008 Summer Olympics.

Medal summary

Men

Women

Medal table 

Ranking by Big (Total result) medals 

Ranking by all medals: Big (Total result) and Small (Snatch and Clean & Jerk)

Participating nations 
175 athletes from 26 nations competed.

 (14)
 (9)
 (1)
 (10)
 (13)
 (7)
 (8)
 (15)
 (1)
 (6)
 (8)
 (1)
 (6)
 (7)
 (1)
 (2)
 (4)
 (8)
 (7)
 (1)
 (2)
 (3)
 (15)
 (8)
 (8)
 (10)

References
Results
Results

External links
Official site

Asian Weightlifting Championships
Asian
W
International weightlifting competitions hosted by Japan
Kanazawa